Clipperstown railway station serves the west of Carrickfergus in County Antrim, Northern Ireland.

Clipperstown station is within walking distance of (and clearly visible from) the larger Carrickfergus station, however road connections between the two are much more complicated. The timetable allows two minutes for the train to travel from Clipperstown to Carrickfergus.

The station was opened on 1 April 1925.

Service

On Saturdays, the service remains half-hourly, with fewer trains at peak times.

On Sundays, the service reduces to an hourly operation in both directions.

References

Railway stations in County Antrim
Railway stations opened in 1925
Railway stations served by NI Railways
Railway stations in Northern Ireland opened in the 20th century